Craig Jarrett (born July 17, 1979) is a former American football punter in the National Football League for the Washington Redskins. He played college football at Michigan State University and was drafted in the sixth round with the 194th overall pick in the 2002 NFL Draft by the Seattle Seahawks.

Jarrett is perhaps best known for taking out two players from Marshall University following a punt during a college football match-up between Michigan State and Marshall.

References

1979 births
Living people
American football punters
Michigan State Spartans football players
Washington Redskins players
People from Martinsville, Indiana